Mathiya Chennai is a 2009 Indian Tamil-language film directed by Vivekanand & Veerasingam. The film stars Jaivanth and Prakash Raj .

Plot

Mathiya Chennai is the story of a man who loves films and dream of becoming director, but he accidentally gets in a brawl with a gangster making his future difficult, but is in love with the gangster's daughter. Later he makes a movie with the help of his lady love and when the film was about to release, the gangster pulls out all the possible options to prevent the film from its screening.

Cast 

Jaivanth
Prakash Raj
Sangeetha
Ramya Barna
Ganja Karuppu
Mahadevan
Shanmugarajan
Charle
Ravi
Sindhu

Soundtrack

The music composed by Ilayaraja.

Reception

The film earned poor reviews.

References

External links
 

2009 films
Films set in Chennai
2000s Tamil-language films
Films scored by Ilaiyaraaja